Lapuyan (Subanen: Benwa Dlepuyan; Chavacano: Municipalidad de Lapuyan), is a 3rd class municipality in the province of Zamboanga del Sur, Philippines. 
According to the 2020 census, it has a population of 27,737 people. The municipality of Lapuyan is located in the southern section of the Zamboanga del Sur province. It is also often referred to as "Little America".

History
Lapuyan was created by separating the barrios of Lapuyan, Maruing, Kumalarang, Karpok, and Timbang, all of the municipality of Margosatubig and formed into a regular municipality by virtue of Executive Order No. 273 on October 16, 1957, by President Carlos P. Garcia upon the recommendation of Sen. Roseller T. Lim, Gov. Bienvenido Ebarle and the Provincial Board of Zamboanga del Sur. The municipality was formally inaugurated on April 21, 1958, with the induction into office of the following municipal officials: Mayor Coco I. Sia, Vice Mayor Bayang Guiaya, Councilors Dr. Vicente Imbing, Datu Manupak Dakula, Benigno Bualan, Javier Suico, Catalino Fernandez and Canuto Lingating.

Upon creation into a regular municipality, the existing barrios within its jurisdiction were Poblacion, Kumalarang, Maruing, Carpok, Bulawan, Lakewood and Sayog.

Geography 

Climate

Barangays
Lapuyan is politically subdivided into 26 barangays.

Demographics

Languages
Subanen, English, Cebuano, Chavacano, Maguindanao, Tagalog/Filipino

Economy

Government 
Upon the municipality's inauguration on April 21, 1958, the first appointed mayor was Mayor Coco Imbing Sia (nephew of Datu Lumok Imbing) and the first appointed Vice Mayor was Bayang Guiaya. The first appointed municipal councilors were Dr. Vicente Imbing, Datu Maneped Dakula, Benigno Bualan, Javier Suico, Canuto Lingating, and Catalino Fernandez. The first appointed municipal officials served for two years from 1957 to 1959.

In the local elections of 1959, the first elected municipal officials were Mayor Coco I. Sia, Vice Mayor Fausto H. Imbing, Councilors Felicidad M. Minor, Dr. Vicente L. Imbing, and four others; they served from 1960 to 1963.

Below is a list of municipal officials who served as mayors and vice mayors of the municipality of Lapuyan.

 1957–1959: Mayor Coco Imbing Sia with Vice Mayor Bayang Guiaya
 1960–1963: Mayor Coco I. Sia with Vice Mayor Fausto H. Imbing
 1964–1967: Mayor Mahalambas D. Huminis with Vice Mayor Consing Bugao
 1968–1971: Mayor Coco Sia with Vice Mayor Jesusa Fernandez
 1972–1975: Mayor Coco Sia with Vice Mayor Quensilan Sulong
 1975–1979: Mayor Quensilan Sulong and Vice Mayor Catalino Bugao, martial law, KBL
 1980–1986: Mayor Dr. Manasi Banghulot and Vice Mayor Lorenzo Sia (assassinated 1985, succeeded by Vice Mayor Miguel D. Villena)
 1987–1988: Mayor Quensilan Sulong with Vice Mayor John Tan Manghay interim
 1988–1991: Mayor Cesar Sulong with Vice Mayor Dr. Vicente Imbing
 1992–1995: Mayor Cesar Sulong with Vice Mayor Romeo Tan (died 1993, succeeded by Vice Mayor Roland H. Lusay)
 1995–1998: Mayor Cesar Sulong with Vice Mayor Roland Lusay
 1998–2001: Mayor Daylinda Sulong with Vice Mayor Berdal Amban
 2001–2004: Mayor Cesar Sulong with Vice Mayor Joel Sulong
 2004–2007: Mayor Cesar Sulong with Vice Mayor Joel Sulong
 2007–2010: Mayor Daylinda P. Sulong with Vice Mayor Joel Sulong
 2010–2013: Mayor Daylinda P. Sulong with Vice Mayor Vicente Mong Fernandez Jr.
 2013-2016: Mayor Daylinda P. Sulong with Vice Mayor Joel B. Sulong
 2016-2019: Mayor Joel B. Sulong with Vice Mayor Daylinda P. Sulong

Subanen heritage

During the Spanish regime, the Subanens were a thriving tribe in the hinterlands of Western Mindanao that had not been conquered by the Spanish colonists, who had their hands full waging wars with the Moros in the South. The ancestral Subanen domains were in the Pingolis and Dumangkilas areas. In the olden times, Pingolis consisted of the areas of Misamis Occidental, Zamboanga del Sur and Zamboanga del Norte. Dumangkilas consisted of Margosatubig up to the Dinas and Dimataling areas. The Spaniards came upon these places almost at the close of the 18th century but were never able to build a permanent settlement, only bayside watchtowers for any upcoming pirate attacks, in Margosatubig and Tukuran, Zamboanga del Sur, and in the shores of Misamis, now Ozamiz City.

Gumabongabon, a native of Cotabato, sought refuge in Mount Malindang in Misamis province to flee from the Muslim faith of Salipabunsuan (Shariff Kabunsuan). He had two sons named Dageneg and Daginding. The younger brother Daginding took over the Subanen leadership from his aging father Gumabongabon. Throughout his lifetime Gumabongabon was never conquered or subjugated either by the Muslim or Christian faith by remaining in the jungles with his family and those that continued his leadership.

Daginding, the surviving son of Gumabongabon, is said to be the origin of the Imbings in Lapuyan. Daginding bore a son named Baless who took over the leadership from Daginding. Baless bore a son named Baan, then Baan begat Paluli, who also begat a son named Habali who begat Bongulan, who bore a son named Pamaisen. The latter also bore a son named Samaya, who bore a son named Lihaiwan, who bore a son named Sanira. It was at the time of the leadership of Sanira that he transferred his place to Salug Valley, now Molave town. There he met and married a wife from Dumangkilas, now Margosatubig, Zamboanga Del Sur. Sanira bore four children, triplets – two boys and one girl. The triplets were called Palaganding, Dainding, and Gumaed. The only girl was named Balao. Among the triplets, Palaganding became the leader after his father Sanira. He was the most feared Subanon leader. He ate his enemies' hearts raw after every battle.

Palaganding married a girl from Pingoles and bore four sons, named Lumang, Mandaulay, Sandok and Talatap, and one daughter named Sinumpay. Son Talatap and daughter Sinumpay were kidnapped by pirates when they were fishing in Dumangkilas bay. Sinumpay was sold by the pirates to a Hadji Usah in Jolo, who married her and became a Muslim. Talatap's fate is not known.

Palaganding's eldest son Lumang took over the leadership of the Subanens when he died. Lumang bore three sons and two daughters. He named his sons Mandal, Bahong, and Imbing. He named his daughters Ames and Amog.

Lumang's youngest son, Imbing, took over the leadership of the Subanens during the American regime. It was during this time that his victorious battle of Mount Guillian took place against the Iranons. Mount Imbing was named by American Governor-General Leonard Wood, who happened to stay with Timuay Beng Imbing on his way to Lakewood, where he saw a lake while flying during World War I. The lake was so beautiful surrounded by trees that General Wood named it Lakewood. Today, Lakewood is already a municipality which was a former barangay of Lapuyan, Zamboanga del Sur.

Timuay Labi (highest) Beng Imbing bore six children — three boys and three girls. He named his boys Calay, Lumok and Purok, all with a title of Datu. He named his girls Calat, Calangian and the last Sindium. The last Subanen Datu among the Subanens was Datu Purok Imbing. After him, there was no more anointment. The American missionaries were already in Lapuyan and the saga of the Datus and Timuays ended its cruel and happy days.

Subanens and Christianity
In the olden days, the Subanens did not have schools; parents were in charge of schooling them. In a family of singers, the mother or the father sang Subanen epics and poems, and read legends and stories. Mothers trained their daughters to weave abaca cloth; the father usually trained their son to do wood carvings or weave rattan baskets and to make musical instruments out of bamboo and wood.

When they came into contact with the Muslims, they learned about the teachings of Islam. Subanens of Lapuyan had early contact with the Spaniards who built a garrison in Margosatubig during the mid-19th century; a school for the natives was opened by Spanish priests but the Subanens misunderstood the message of Christianity. They were scared to see a stick (the cross) with a dead man (Jesus) on it. The cross, which they called "karehus", was interpreted differently; the early Catholic missionaries were thought of as cannibals. With the coming of the Americans, Protestant missionaries brought big picture rolls showing among others, the baby Jesus and the Mother Mary. The old folks associated these stories with their own tribal beliefs of a “Diwata” or God-child, a savior of mankind. With this understanding, Subanen elders now encouraged their children to go to the mission school run by these American missionaries. In 1912, Mr. & Mrs. David O. Lund opened a mission school in Sunglupa in the village of Thimuay Imbing, now a part of the Municipality of Lapuyan. Thimuay Imbing accepted the new religion, a Protestant denomination of the Christian and Missionary Alliance whose headquarters were located in Nyac, New York, in 1914; they constructed a semi-permanent-building called the Pampang Tabernacle where the Subanen worshipped. Next to the Tetuan Church in Zamboanga City, the Lapuyan Tabernacle became the first Alliance Church in Mindanao, if not the entire Philippines. There were further changes in the way of life of the Subanen in Lapuyan with the opening of government schools in 1919.

Education

Colleges
Lomasson Alliance Bible College
Josephina H. Cerilles State College-Lapuyan External Studies Unit

High schools
Lapuyan National High School
Maruing National High School
Bulawan National High School
Tiguha National High School
Maralag National High School
Karpok National High School
Pampang National High School

Elementary schools

References

External links
 Lapuyan Profile at PhilAtlas.com
 [ Philippine Standard Geographic Code]
Philippine Census Information
 

Municipalities of Zamboanga del Sur
Establishments by Philippine executive order